Hurricane Ismael was a strong tropical cyclone that resulted in heavy rains and flash floods across portions of Mexico during mid-August 1989. The ninth named storm, fifth hurricane and the first major hurricane of the very active 1989 Pacific hurricane season, Ismael formed from a tropical wave that traversed Central America on August 11.

The tropical wave that formed Ismael formed off the coast of northwestern Africa on July 31. After traversing off Central America without any activity, the trough developed deep convection and developed into Tropical Depression Eleven-E on August 14 and into Tropical Storm Ismael on August 15, just one day later.

After producing downpours of rain killing 3, Ismael turned westward and for the next week, would be controlled by a high-pressured area. Along the way, Ismael interacted with a tropical wave, which spawned Tropical Storm Juliette.The hostile and cold water and an increase in wind shear would take its toll on Ismael as it went from a Category 2 storm to a tropical storm on August 23. Ismael would weaken to a tropical depression and soon dissipated with its remnants headed towards Hawaii. The remnants soon dispersed as they headed towards Hawaii.

Meteorological history

Traces of Hurricane Ismael can be found from a tropical wave that emerged off of northwestern Africa back on July 31. The trough passed through the Atlantic and Caribbean without any event. After passing through Central America without any significant convection or organization, the trough entered the Intertropical Convergence Zone (ITCZ) on August 11.

Three days later, after moving westward, the system began to better organize while still being off the coast of Mexico. After significant increase in convection and organization, and satellite animation showing an organized upper-level outflow, the trough intensified to Tropical Depression Eleven-E on August 14.

Just a day later, on August 15, Eleven-E had winds up to 35 mph with a barometric pressure of 1004 mbar and had intensified into a tropical storm based on the Dvorak technique. Eleven-E was designated as Tropical Storm Ismael on 8:30 UTC. Ismael had developed rainbands which helped contribute to finding intensity.

Ismael had produced heavy rain from Acapulco to the Sierra Madre del Sur Mountains as it skirted along the coast of Guerrero. Flash floods and mudslides had also occurred in the area. 3 deaths had also occurred in the area. On August 16, Ismael quickly intensified into a hurricane as it formed a visible eye at 8:30 UTC with winds up to 75 knots. Ismael had maintained a westerly course towards the Hawaiian Islands through the rest of its lifetime.

The eye of Ismael was clouded and soon, went through a period of degenerating after moving into colder waters. While Ismael continued on its westward course, the system made contact with another tropical wave which eventually led to the formation of Tropical Storm Twelve-E. A few days later, the system intensified into Tropical Storm Juliette.

Ismael had intensified back to Category 2 status with  maximum sustained winds at 18:00 UTC the next day and continued a trend with rising and falling speeds. From August 23 – 24, Ismael had experienced rapid weakening. The system went from a Category 2 hurricane to a tropical storm in a day. A sign of weakening from Ismael was an open vortex. Deep convection had decreased and an entry into cooler waters deteriorated Ismael's structure as well. Ismael had degenerated into a tropical depression and soon, a remnant on the 25 of August. The remnants of Ismael headed towards Hawaii, but the government of Hawaii did not put any warnings. The remnants dispersed on August 26.

Impact
Although Hurricane Ismael did not make landfall, it did impact Mexico with rainfall from its rain bands. Ismael also killed 3 people while intensifying into a hurricane. One person by the name of Rhonda Santos was swept by Ismael's 8 foot waves and drowned off of Laguna Beach, in California. The storm was 450 miles off the coast of San Diego, California. Two other people had also died from drowning due to Ismael's waves. The system also brought heavy rains to Acapulco. Not much else was recorded.

See also 

 1989 Pacific hurricane season
 Tropical Storm Juliette (1989) – Ismael contributed to Juliette's formation
 Hurricane Ismael and other uses of Ismael for hurricane names.

References
External links

External links 

 The Joint Typhoon Warning Center
 The National Hurricane Center
 The National Oceanic and Atmospheric Administration

1989 Pacific hurricane season
Pacific hurricanes in Mexico
Category 3 Pacific hurricanes